Perigrapha is a genus of moths of the family Noctuidae.

Species 

 Perigrapha albilinea Draudt, 1950
 Perigrapha annaus Varga & Ronkay, 1991
 Perigrapha asymmetrica Varga, 1990
 Perigrapha brunnea
 Perigrapha centralasiae Bartel, 1906
 Perigrapha cilissa Püngeler, 1917
 Perigrapha cincta
 Perigrapha circumducta Lederer, 1855
 Perigrapha duktana Draudt, 1934
 Perigrapha extincta Kononenko, 1989
 Perigrapha flora Hreblay, 1996
 Perigrapha heidi Hreblay, 1996
 Perigrapha hoenei Püngeler, 1914
 Perigrapha i-cinctum Denis & Schiffermüller, 1775
 Perigrapha irkuta
 Perigrapha kofka
 Perigrapha mithras Wiltshire, 1941
 Perigrapha munda Denis & Schiffermüller, 1775
 Perigrapha mundoides Boursin, 1940
 Perigrapha nigrocincta Hreblay & Ronkay, 1997
 Perigrapha nyctotimia Boursin, 1969
 Perigrapha pallescens
 Perigrapha pallida
 Perigrapha pamiricola Hreblay & Kononenko, 1995
 Perigrapha plumbeata
 Perigrapha rorida Frivaldszky, 1835
 Perigrapha scriptobella Hreblay, 1996
 Perigrapha sellingi Fibiger, Hacker & Moberg, 1996
 Perigrapha slovenica
 Perigrapha sugitanii
 Perigrapha triangulifera
 Perigrapha uniformis Draudt, 1950
 Perigrapha unimaculata
 Perigrapha wimmeri Hacker, 1996
 Perigrapha wolfi Hacker, 1988
 Perigrapha yoshimotoi

References
 Natural History Museum Lepidoptera genus database
 Perigrapha at funet.fi

Orthosiini
Taxa named by Julius Lederer